Federico Caffè (born 6 January 1914; disappeared 15 April 1987; declared dead 30 October 1998) was a notable Italian economist from the Keynesian School.

Early life 
Caffè graduated in Business Sciences from the University of Rome La Sapienza in 1936. After World War II, he spent one year in the United Kingdom studying at the London School of Economics. During that period, he came in contact with the Keynesian Economics and saw up close the policies implemented by the then Labour government. Back in Italy, he started his career working at the Bank of Italy, later becoming a teacher at the University of Messina. From 1959 he taught Economic and Financial Policy at the University of Rome La Sapienza, forming several generations of economists in what is the largest university in Italy.

Career
Caffè mentored several generations of Italian economists, many of whom rose to senior positions in academia, political life and public administration.

In different capacities he mentored the former Governor of the Bank of Italy, and of the ECB President, and Italian incumbent Prime Minister Professor Mario Draghi, the current Governor of the Bank of Italy, Ignazio Visco, the planning theorist Franco Archibugi, the welfare economist Bruno Amoroso, the labour economist Ezio Tarantelli, killed by the Red Brigades in 1985 in the courtyard of the Faculty of Economics in Rome where they taught, the former President of the Italian Statistical Office Guido M. Rey, the former President of the Italian Statistical Office and incumbent Minister for Infrastructures Enrico Giovannini, the Economic policy's theorist Nicola Acocella, the neo-ricardian economist Fernando Vianello and economist of innovation Daniele Archibugi.

Views
Caffè was particularly interested in economic policy and welfare, especially in their social dimensions. One of his books, Lezioni di politica economica (Lectures on Economic Policy), is widely regarded as the complete summary of his ideas. He was a strong critic of free trade, avowedly Keynesian in inspiration, and also very interested in the Scandinavian welfare model.

Disappearance
On 15 April 1987 Caffè suddenly disappeared, shortly after having quit university teaching. He was "officially declared dead" on 30 October 1998. The mystery involved in his death has not been revealed. He may have committed suicide, but he may also have decided to disappear to an unknown location.

Memorials 
Several institutions have been named after him, including the Faculty of Economics of the University of Rome III, the Roskilde University Centre for Southern European Studies and the Library of the Department of Economics of the Faculty of Economics and Business of the Sapienza University of Rome. The Aula Magna of Pescara University is called Federico Caffè also. The Sapienza University of Rome also organizes annual conference that have been held by some of the most significant economists of our age. Many of the lectures have been published in a series of the Cambridge University Press.

Bibliography

Main works published by Federico Caffè 
 Saggi sulla moderna "economia del benessere", (editor), Boringhieri, Torino (1956)
 Economisti moderni, (editor), Garzanti, Milano (1962); reprinted, Laterza, Bari, (1971).
 Politica economica, Boringhieri, Torino (1966 e 1970 - two volumes)
 Teorie e problemi di politica sociale, Laterza, Bari (1970)
 Un'economia in ritardo, Boringhieri, Torino (1976)
 Lezioni di politica economica, Bollati Boringhieri, Torino (1978)
 L'economia contemporanea. I protagonisti e altri saggi, Edizioni Studium, Roma (1981)
 In difesa del welfare state, Rosenberg & Sellier, Torino (1986). New and augmented version, 2014, edited by Paolo Ramazzotti,

Works published after his disappearance 
 La solitudine del riformista, Bollati Boringhieri, Torino (1990), Edited by Nicola Acocella and Maurizio Franzini, 
 Scritti quotidiani, Manifestolibri, Roma (2007), ; which collects the writings he published on the newspaperil manifesto from 1976 to 1985.
 Contro gli incappucciati della finanza. Tutti gli scritti: Il Messaggero 1974-1986, L'Ora, 1983-1987, Edited by Giuseppe Amari, Castelvecchi, Roma, 2013.
 La dignità del lavoro, a cura di Giuseppe Amari, Castelvecchi, Roma, 2014,

See also
 List of people who disappeared

Notes

Sources
 Acocella, N. (5th edition ed.), "F. Caffé, Lezioni di politica economica", Bollati Boringhieri, Torino, 1990, .
 Acocella, N., "In difesa del welfare state, dieci anni dopo", in: Acocella, N. & Rey, G. M. & Tiberi, M. (eds), "Saggi di politica economica in onore di Federico Caffè", vol. III, Franco Angeli, Milano, 1999.
 Daniele Archibugi, Federico Caffè, solitario maestro, Micromega, n. 2, (1991)
 Ermanno Rea, L'ultima lezione, Einaudi, Turin (1992)
 Riccardo Faucci, "L'economia per frammenti di Federico Caffè", Rivista italiana degli economisti, n. 3 (2002)
 Bruno Amoroso, La stanza rossa - Riflessioni scandinave di Federico Caffè, Edizioni Città Aperta, Troina (Enna), (2004)
 Giuseppe Amari (editor), Federico Caffè: un economista per il nostro tempo, Roma, Ediesse, 2009.

External links
 Profile of Federico Caffè  at the Department of Public Economics of Sapienza University of Rome  
 A biography of Federico Caffè (from the Roskilde University website)
 http://giuseppecapograssi.wordpress.com/2012/11/13/federico-caffe-un-economista-per-gli-uomini-comuni-audio/

1914 births
1987 deaths
1980s missing person cases
20th-century Italian economists
Keynesian economics
Missing person cases in Italy
People from Pescara
Sapienza University of Rome alumni
Academic staff of the Sapienza University of Rome
Academic staff of the University of Messina
People declared dead in absentia